L'arbore di Diana (The Tree of Diana), is an opera in two acts composed by Vicente Martín y Soler, with an original libretto by Lorenzo da Ponte. It premiered at the Burgtheater in Vienna on 1 October 1787.

Background and performance history

Da Ponte's librettos for L'arbore di Diana and  Così fan tutte were the only ones of his not taken from an existing plot. The opera's premiere on  1 October 1787 marked a visit to Vienna of the niece of Holy Roman Emperor Joseph II, the Archduchess Maria Teresa, who was on her way to Dresden to marry Prince Anton Clemens of Saxony in person (they had been married by proxy in Florence the month before). The work was enormously successful in its day, but Martín's operas have since fallen from the repertoire. A revival was performed during the 2007/2008 season at the Theater Bielefeld in North Rhine Westphalia, Germany. The opera was revived and recorded in Valencia in 2008 at the Palau de les Arts Reina Sofía. It has also been revived in Barcelona in 2009 at the Gran Teatre del Liceu and the Minnesota Opera in 2017, the latter conducted by Michael Christie.

The music consists of "an amalgam of through-composed conversations and encounters, punctuated by brief songs and ariettas"; the plot concerns the goddess Diana's attempts to defend her island as a stronghold of chastity.  When confronted by the good-looking shepherd Doristo her defences fall down.

Roles

Recordings
Soler: L'arbore di Diana – Laura Aikin (Diana), Michael Maniaci (Amore), Ainhoa Gramendia (Britomarte/Genio 1), Marisa Martins (Clizia/Genio 2), Jossie Pérez (Cloe/Genio 3), Charles Workman (Silvio), Steve Davislim (Endimione), Marco Vinco (Doristo); Gran Teatre del Liceu Orchestra and Chorus; Harry Bicket (conductor); Francisco Negrin (director). Recorded Barcelona, 2009. Label: Dynamic DVD 33651

Score
L'arbore di Diana, critical edition by Leonardo Waisman, IBERAUTOR/ICCMU. Madrid, 2001.

References

Anthony Holden, Lorenzo Da Ponte, The Man Who Wrote Mozart (2006) 
Jesson, Roy (1972). "Martin's L'arbore di Diana", The Musical Times, Vol. 113, No. 1552 (June, 1972), pp. 551–553 

Italian-language operas
Operas
1787 operas
Operas by Vicente Martín y Soler
Opera world premieres at the Burgtheater